The Houston Christian Huskies softball team, known as the Houston Baptist Huskies until 2022, represents the Houston Christian University, located in Houston, Texas. The Huskies are a member of the Southland Conference and participate in NCAA Division I college softball. The team is currently led by head coach Mary–Ellen Hall and plays home games at Husky Field.

History 
Source:
The first year of the softball team was 1989 under Dr. Les Sanders who led the Huskies for three seasons finishing with an overall record of 47–75. The current head coach, Mary–Ellen Hall, started in 1992. The 2015 season was her 24th as head coach of the team. As of the conclusion of the 2015 season, the Huskies's record under Hall is 741–440. Overall, the team has an all-time record of 788–513 (.606).

The Huskies competed in NCAA Division I play their initial season, 1989. From 1990 through 2007, the team competed in NAIA Division I play. While an NAIA member, the team was nationally ranked every season from 1996 through the final NAIA season, 2007.  Highest final ranking was in 2nd in 2005 when the Huskies finished the season with a 51–5 record.

In 2008, the Huskes moved back to NCAA Division I play competing initially as an independent. Joining the Great West Conference in 2010, the Huskies won the conference championship in 2011. The Huskies started Southland Conference play in 2013.

Year-by-year results

Head coaches

References

External links